Events from the year 1886 in Sweden

Incumbents
 Monarch – Oscar II
 Prime Minister – Robert Themptander

Events
 The Dress reform society Svenska drägtreformföreningen is founded. 
 - Brunkeberg Tunnel
 - Halmstad Bolmen Railway
 - Stella (magazine)
 - Storlien Station
 - Svenska Barnmorskeförbundet (The Swedish Midwifery Association) is founded by Johanna Hedén.

Births

 18 January – Clara Nordström, Swedish-born German writer and translator (died 1962)
 6 March – Hugo Jahnke, gymnast (died 1939).
 16 March – Herbert Lindström, tug-of-war competitor (died 1951).
 April 1 – Brita von Horn, dramatist, novelist and theatre director (died 1983)
 9 June – Tora Dahl, writer (died 1982).
 25 August – Östen Undén, politician, prime minister (died 1974).
 Eva Andén, lawyer, first woman in the Swedish Bar Association (died 1970).

Deaths

 – Isak Albert Berg, singer, composer (born 1803)

References

 
Years of the 19th century in Sweden
Sweden